John Aubrey Conway Howarth,  (19 February 1896 – 31 March 1984) was an English stage, radio and television actor, best remembered for his role as grumpy but likeable elderly war veteran Albert Tatlock in the TV series Coronation Street between 1960 and 1984, in which he was an original cast member. Prior to his work with Coronation Street, he had a lengthy career in theatre, and in the radio soap opera Mrs. Dale's Diary.

Early and personal life
Born at 96 Mitchell Street, Rochdale, Lancashire, Howarth was the son of comedian Bert Howarth, and went to school with the singer and actress Gracie Fields.

As a child, Howarth sold theatre programmes at the Theatre Royal, Rochdale, and in 1908 at the age of twelve he began playing juvenile roles on stage. He joined the Lancashire Fusiliers in 1915 and served in France and Belgium in World War I.

He married Sarah E. "Betty" Murgatroyd at St Mary and St Peter Parish Church, Hull, East Riding of Yorkshire, on 25 July 1929. The couple were married for 55 years, until Howarth's death and had a son, John Jr., in 1930. It was reported that Howarth bought his wife so much jewellery, she had to keep it in the bank.

His interests included travel and paintings.

Career 
Howarth ran a small cinema after the outbreak of the First World War. From 1935, he also ran his own theatre in Colwyn Bay, taking most of the male roles himself, due to the lack of men available to play the parts.

He toured the country in theatre performances where he met and married his wife Betty in Hull on 25 July 1929. He also appeared in a number of films including The Man in the White Suit (1951) and Hobson's Choice (1954).

Howarth made his Coronation Street debut in the first episode in December 1960 and appeared in over 1,300 episodes until his final appearance on 23 January 1984, which was recorded in December 1983.

Death
Howarth spent his final years living in Deganwy, North Wales, with his wife. On 31 March 1984, he died in Llandudno General Hospital from kidney failure and pneumonia, with his wife and son at his bedside. Howarth was cremated six days later at a private funeral in Colwyn Bay. He left his wife £60,000 in his will.

Howarth was Britain's oldest working actor at the time of his death. His death meant that William Roache, who played Albert Tatlock's nephew-in-law, Ken Barlow, was the only original actor left on Coronation Street at that time. The decision to kill off the Albert Tatlock character was made shortly after Howarth's real life death, and Tatlock's death was aired in the episode dated 14 May 1984.

A memorial service was held on 19 June 1984, at St Paul's, Covent Garden, attended by Leslie Crowther, Dickie Henderson, Geoff Love and David Jacobs.

Filmography

Permanent role

Charity work and Honours
Howarth was the subject of This Is Your Life in November 1974 when he was surprised by Eamonn Andrews on the set of Coronation Street. When Andrews said, "I'm taking you to London", Howarth replied "Oh no, you're not, you know." He was eventually persuaded to appear on the show, joined by the cast of Coronation Street, with tributes from stars including Bryan Mosley, Betty Driver, Eileen Derbyshire, Margot Bryant, Thora Hird and Arthur Lowe.

Howarth was made an MBE in January 1983 for his charity work, especially for supporting the disabled and children with general learning difficulties. He was national vice-president for Scope, and left them £250 in his will. Howarth had raised more than £50,000 for the charity by collecting a donation each time he signed an autograph.

References

External links
 
 http://www.corrie.net/profiles/characters/tatlock_albert.html

English male stage actors
English male soap opera actors
Actors from Rochdale
1896 births
1984 deaths
Lancashire Fusiliers soldiers
British Army personnel of World War I
Members of the Order of the British Empire
Deaths from pneumonia in Wales